Donald Andrew Moog (born February 18, 1960) is a Canadian former professional ice hockey goaltender. Moog played in the National Hockey League (NHL) for the Edmonton Oilers, Boston Bruins, Dallas Stars and Montreal Canadiens, and also for the Canadian national team. Moog is a three-time Stanley Cup champion: 1984, 1985 and 1987. He earned the William M. Jennings Trophy in the 1989–90 NHL season for fewest total goals against the team during the regular season, sharing the trophy with his goaltending partner, Reggie Lemelin.

Moog spent the 2009–10 season as an assistant coach for the Dallas Stars.

Personal
Moog's parents are Shirley and Don Moog, the latter an amateur goaltender who played for the Penticton Vees when they won the 1955 IIHF World Ice Hockey Championship. After playing minor hockey in Penticton, Andy Moog advanced to the junior ranks, first in the B.C. Junior Hockey League, and then on to the Billings Bighorns of the Western Hockey League (WHL), where he was named a WHL all star in 1979–80. Moog's talents caught the eye of the NHL's Edmonton Oilers, who made Moog their sixth pick – 132nd overall – in the 1980 NHL entry draft.

Edmonton Oilers
Moog was drafted by the Edmonton Oilers in 1980 and spent most of the season in the minors, until injuries to goaltenders Ron Low and Eddie Mio forced him into action late in the season. That year he was spectacular in a three-game first round sweep of the Montreal Canadiens. The following year, Moog was expected to share goaltending duties with Low, but then a 19-year-old Grant Fuhr surprisingly made the team straight out of training camp. Moog was once again relegated to the minors, appearing in only eight NHL games that season.

In 1982–83, Oilers general manager and coach Glen Sather decided to go with the young duo of Moog and Fuhr and traded Low. Moog was given the starting job in the playoffs, and helped lead the Oilers to their first Stanley Cup Finals, though they were swept by the New York Islanders, who captured their fourth straight Stanley Cup. The next year Sather chose to go with Fuhr in the 1984 playoffs. Fuhr was injured in the third game of the Stanley Cup Finals in a rematch against the Islanders. Moog stepped in and led the Oilers to a series win.

Fuhr continued to be the number one goalie for the subsequent seasons. After demanding a trade, Moog walked out on the Oilers in 1987 to play for Team Canada at the Calgary Winter Olympics. There, Moog and Sean Burke played four games each, with Canada finishing fourth. Glen Sather offered to trade Moog to the Pittsburgh Penguins for Steve Guenette and a first round draft pick, but Penguins owner Edward J. DeBartolo, Sr. told his general manager, Eddie Johnston, that he could not trade a first round draft pick.

Boston Bruins
At the trading deadline of the 1987–88 season, Moog was traded to the Boston Bruins for Bill Ranford shortly after the 1988 Winter Olympics in Calgary. The Bruins implemented a goalie tandem, with Moog and Reggie Lemelin sharing starting duties. Lemelin was in goal for most of the action during the team's run to the Stanley Cup Final in 1988, as Boston was swept by the Oilers in four games — Edmonton's fourth Cup title in five years. Moog was in goal for the series' final game. Despite Lemelin initially starting in net during the 1990 playoffs, after the Bruins had won the Presidents' Trophy for having the best regular season record in the NHL, Moog eventually took over the starting position. After a few games and performing heroics, Moog's team went all of the way to the 1990 Stanley Cup Final.

A highlight for Moog in the 1990 NHL playoffs was during the first round against the Hartford Whalers. With Hartford leading two games to one and leading in game four by a 5–2 score entering the third period, Moog replaced Lemelin in goal and shut out the Whalers for the remainder of the game. The Bruins rallied for a comeback by scoring four goals in the third period. In the 1990 Stanley Cup Finals, the Bruins lost in five games to Moog's old team, Edmonton, who were backstopped by Ranford.

In both the 1991 and 1992 Stanley Cup playoffs, the Bruins defeated the Canadiens in the second round to make it to the Prince of Wales Conference Finals. Moog soon gained a reputation as the Bruins' biggest "Hab-killer" shutting out the Canadiens as part of a sweep in the 1992 postseason. However, the Bruins lost both series to the Pittsburgh Penguins who were led by Mario Lemieux. In 1991, Boston took the first two games of the series, but Pittsburgh went on to win the next four games and the series, followed by a Penguins win of the Stanley Cup. Again in 1992, Boston was no match for Pittsburgh and was swept in four games during the Conference Finals.

In the 1992–93 season, Moog did not start well, partly because of a poor relationship with head coach Brian Sutter, and partly because of the death of his father in January 1993. After the rough start, things improved and Moog backstopped his team to the Adams Division title and the second-best record overall, behind Pittsburgh. Moog finished the season strong and was runner-up for the William Jennings Trophy. The 1993 playoffs, however, were a disaster. Boston was unexpectedly swept by the Buffalo Sabres, three of the four losses coming in overtime. In the final game of the series Moog gave up the overtime goal to the Sabres' Brad May.

As of 2019, Moog ranks third on the Bruins' list of playoff wins by a goaltender with 36, behind Tuukka Rask at 50 and Gerry Cheevers who has 53.

During the middle and latter years of his career, Moog served as vice-president of the National Hockey League Players Association. This position made him a spokesman for the players, both during the 1992 NHL players strike and the 1994-95 NHL lockout.

Andy Moog's Bruins mask was voted one of the scariest goalie masks by The Hockey News.

Dallas Stars
Moog was traded to the Minnesota North Stars, who relocated to Dallas as the Dallas Stars for the 1993–94 season. He led them to a winning record to return the Stars to the playoffs, where they reached the second round. In the 1996–97 NHL season, Moog helped Dallas to the Central Division title, but they were upset in the first round in seven games by the underdog Edmonton Oilers. During his time with the Stars, Moog often shared the workload of regular season games with Darcy Wakaluk and later Artūrs Irbe.

Later career
With the Stars bringing in Ed Belfour, Moog signed as a free agent with the Montreal Canadiens for the 1997–98 NHL season. While Moog had helped eliminate Montreal from the playoffs four times (once with the Oilers and three times with the Bruins), he led the Habs to their first playoff series win since 1993. In the summer of 1998, Moog was offered a contract to play for the Vancouver Canucks, but he chose to retire and instead became the team's goaltending coach.

Moog was selected to play in the National Hockey League All-Star Game four times over his career, twice with the Oilers (1985 and 1986), and once each with the Bruins (1991), and Stars (1997). In his two All-Star appearances as an Oiler, both he and Fuhr were selected to the team.

On August 19, 2005, Team Canada appointed Moog as goaltending consultant for the 2006 Winter Olympics team.

On September 12, 2009, Moog was named assistant coach of the Dallas Stars.  His contract expired July 1, 2010, and he was not offered an extension.

Currently, Moog is an on-air analyst for Fox Sports Southwest during Dallas Stars games.

Moog & Friends Hospice
In the early 1990s, Moog helped fund Moog & Friends Hospice in Penticton.

Awards and achievements
1979-80 - WHL Second All-Star Team
1983–84 - NHL - Stanley Cup (Edmonton)
1984–85 - NHL - Stanley Cup (Edmonton)
1984-85 - NHL - NHL All-Star Game
1985-86 - NHL - NHL All-Star Game
1986–87 - NHL - Stanley Cup (Edmonton)
1989-90 - NHL - William M. Jennings Trophy - with Réjean Lemelin
1990-91 - NHL - NHL All-Star Game
1996-97 - NHL - NHL All-Star Game

Moog is the second-fastest goaltender to reach the 300 win mark, doing so in his 543rd game. He is second only to Jacques Plante (526). He was the fifth goaltender to attain 360 and 370 wins. Moog also has the highest winning percentage of any goaltender not in the Hockey Hall of Fame (.580), tied with Chris Osgood.

Career statistics

Regular season and playoffs

International

See also
List of NHL goaltenders with 300 wins

References

External links
 

1960 births
Billings Bighorns players
Boston Bruins players
Canadian ice hockey goaltenders
Canadian people of Scottish descent
Dallas Stars coaches
Dallas Stars players
Edmonton Oilers draft picks
Edmonton Oilers players
Ice hockey people from British Columbia
Ice hockey players at the 1988 Winter Olympics
Kamloops Chiefs players
Living people
Montreal Canadiens players
National Hockey League All-Stars
National Hockey League assistant coaches
Olympic ice hockey players of Canada
Penticton Vees players
Sportspeople from Penticton
Stanley Cup champions
Vancouver Canucks coaches
Wichita Wind players
William M. Jennings Trophy winners
Canadian ice hockey coaches